The Division of Diamond Valley was an 
Australian Electoral Division in Victoria. 
The division was created in 1969 and abolished in 1984. It was named for the Diamond Creek area. It was located in the north-eastern suburbs of Melbourne, including Doncaster, Watsonia, Eltham and Templestowe. With the expansion of the Parliament in 1984, the Division was effectively split in two, the western half forming the new Division of Jagajaga, and the eastern half the Division of Menzies.

Always held by the government of the day, the seat was marginal between the Australian Labor Party and the Liberal Party. This is reflected by the state of its successor seats. Menzies has always been a safe Liberal seat, while Jagajaga has been a fairly safe to safe Labor seat.

Members

Election results

1969 establishments in Australia
Constituencies established in 1969
1984 disestablishments in Australia
Constituencies disestablished in 1984
Diamond Valley